Robert P. Spellane (born March 5, 1970 in Worcester, Massachusetts) is an American politician who represented the 13th Worcester District in the Massachusetts House of Representatives from 2001 to 2011.

References

1970 births
Democratic Party members of the Massachusetts House of Representatives
Politicians from Worcester, Massachusetts
Roanoke College alumni
Living people